Murray Hill is a station on the Long Island Rail Road's Port Washington Branch in the Murray Hill  subsection of Flushing in Queens, New York City. The station is part of CityTicket. The station is located beneath 150th Street and 41st Avenue, just south of Roosevelt Avenue.

History
Murray Hill station was originally built in April 1889, and torn down in 1912 when the Port Washington branch was depressed below grade in this area between 1912 and 1914. The station house was replaced in July 1914 with one built on a bridge built over the tracks. This structure was torn down in 1964, and Murray Hill continues to operate as an unmanned station to this day. Minor renovations took place between 1991 and 1993. A new pedestrian bridge as well as other amenities were added in 2005. Two elevators were opened by May 4, 2020. The elevators were originally slated for completion in 2019, but were delayed to mid-2020 due to delays in the delivery of elevator cabs.

Station layout
The station has two high-level side platforms, each four cars long. The first four cars toward Manhattan and the last four cars toward Great Neck and Port Washington will platform.

References

External links

Forgotten NY.com(2005 photos):
Current Murray Hill "Station" gateway,  Existing pedestrian bridge,
Waiting area, and Bicycle Rack
Murray Hill Station - "MI" Cabin (Arrt's Arrchives)
 41st Avenue and 149th Place entrance from Google Maps Street View
 Barton Avenue entrance from Google Maps Street View
Platforms from Google Maps Street View

Railway stations in Queens, New York
Railway stations in the United States opened in 1889
Railway stations in the United States opened in 1914
Long Island Rail Road stations in New York City
1889 establishments in New York (state)